Alhóndiga is a municipality of Guadalajara, Spain.

Alhóndiga may also refer to:

 Alhóndiga (building), in Spain, a type of historic establishment where grain was traded and stored
 Alhóndiga (Toledo), a building in Toledo, Spain
 Alhóndiga Bilbao, a culture and leisure center in Bilbao, Spain
 Alhóndiga de Granaditas, an old granary, now a museum, in Guanajuato, Mexico

Alhóndigas